Márk Koszta (born 26 September 1996) is a Hungarian football player. He plays for Maccabi Bnei Reineh on loan from Torpedo Moscow.

Club career
On 4 September 2022, Koszta signed with Russian Premier League club FC Torpedo Moscow.

Club statistics

Updated to games played as of 27 November 2022.

References

External links
HLSZ
MLSZ

1996 births
Sportspeople from Miskolc
Living people
Hungarian footballers
Hungary youth international footballers
Hungary under-21 international footballers
Association football forwards
Budapest Honvéd FC II players
Budapest Honvéd FC players
Kisvárda FC players
Mezőkövesdi SE footballers
Újpest FC players
Zalaegerszegi TE players
Ulsan Hyundai FC players
FC Torpedo Moscow players
Maccabi Bnei Reineh F.C. players
Nemzeti Bajnokság I players
Nemzeti Bajnokság II players
Russian Premier League players
Israeli Premier League players
Hungarian expatriate footballers
Expatriate footballers in South Korea
Expatriate footballers in Russia
Expatriate footballers in Israel
Hungarian expatriate sportspeople in South Korea
Hungarian expatriate sportspeople in Russia
Hungarian expatriate sportspeople in Israel